State Highway 10 (abbreviated SH-10) is a state highway in northeastern Oklahoma. It makes a  crescent through the northeast corner of the state, running from SH-99 in Osage County to Interstate 40 (I-40) near Gore. It has two lettered spur routes.

SH-10 first appeared as part of the original highway system designated in 1924. The route originally served eastern Oklahoma as a border-to-border route, connecting the Red River near Hugo to the Missouri state line near Joplin, Missouri. Much of the southern half of the route was dropped in 1941, while western extensions throughout the 1940s brought the highway to its current routing.

Route description

Highway 10 begins at State Highway 99 northwest of the unincorporated town of Bigheart. The highway runs northeast of this point through sparsely-populated Osage County. The route runs across the dam forming Lake Hulah and runs through its eponymous unincorporated community. East of this, it crosses into Washington County, where it skirts Copan Lake. The route then proceeds to the town of Copan, where it intersects US-75. SH-10 progresses east to Nowata County, entering the county near Wann, before meeting US-169 around Elliot. It forms a concurrency with US-169 through the town of Lenapah, and splits off and heads due east from there. It does not intersect any highways or pass through any sizeable towns until Welch, where it meets US-59/SH-2. It then continues east to Miami, Oklahoma where it overlaps with US-59/69 and meets State Highway 125. After passing through Miami and passing the northern terminus of State Highway 137, SH-10 reaches its northeasternmost point at the western terminus of SH-10C (see below). After this point, all of SH-10 is north–south.

SH-10 has a brief concurrency with U.S. Highway 60 near Wyandotte. From this junction, the route turns to the west for the three-mile (4.8 km) stretch to Grove. Until recently, SH-25 and SH-10 were concurrent along this stretch, but SH-25 now ends at the aforementioned junction. In downtown Grove, SH-10 again joins US-59, and is signed with that highway for 30 miles (48 km) through mostly rural parts of Delaware County, including the county seat, Jay, where State Highway 20 joins with SH-10 and US-59 for approximately two miles.

(US-59 departs just south of the interchange and follows US-412 east toward the Arkansas state line at West Siloam Springs.) SH-10 then begins paralleling the Illinois River, a popular recreation area primarily accessed through SH-10. It then heads eastbound again at US-62/State Highway 51. SH-10 forms a concurrency with these two highways to Tahlequah, where SH-51 splits off. US-62 and SH-10 remain concurrent until south of Ft. Gibson.

After leaving US-62, SH-10 runs mostly parallel to the Arkansas River, passing through the towns of Braggs, Oklahoma and Gore. It has a brief concurrency with U.S. Highway 64 to cross the Arkansas River, and splits off to the south in Webbers Falls. Just after this it ends at Interstate 40.

History
SH-10 was first added to the state highway system on August 24, 1924. The original route of the highway began at the Texas state line south of Hugo and followed present-day US-271 northward to Spiro, Oklahoma, where it turned west along present-day State Highway 9. The highway then resumed a northbound course along present-day SH-2 to Warner. In Warner, it turned east to follow what is now US-64 to Webbers Falls and Gore. From Gore, it followed its current route to what is now the western terminus of SH-10C. From that intersection, rather than turning west towards Miami, SH-10 continued northeast to end southwest of Joplin, Missouri, approximately where Interstate 44 crosses the state line now. By 1927, however, the northern terminus had been relocated to Miami.

The Miami terminus lasted until January 30, 1930, when the highway was truncated to the US-60 junction near Wyandotte. However, this change would be reversed seven years later; SH-10 once again ended in Miami beginning February 3, 1937. SH-10 was extended to the west for the first time in 1941. The route's western terminus was moved to SH-2 at Welch on April 14, 1941. However, the other terminus was moved north at the end of that year, resulting in SH-10 being truncated to Gore after November 12, 1941. SH-10 was then extended farther west, to US-169 at Lenapah, on April 3, 1944.

A new section of highway, running from SH-99 to Copan, was added to the state highway system on August 21, 1954. This road was also assigned the SH-10 designation, creating a gap in the highway between Copan and Lenapah. This gap would persist until August 3, 1981, when SH-10 was extended east from Copan to US-169, filling the gap. This road is shown as SH-7 on the 1936 and 1937 Oklahoma official highway maps.

Interstate 40 was built through Sequoyah County in the late 1960s. SH-10 was extended from Gore along US-64 to Exit 291 on June 1, 1970. This brought SH-10 to its present-day southern terminus.

The section of SH-10 east of Gore was pressed into service as a detour for I-40 traffic after the collapse of its bridge over the Arkansas River on May 26, 2002. The detour significantly impacted the town of Gore. Local firefighters directed traffic there 24 hours a day, with daytime temperatures approaching . Businesses in Gore reported loss of revenue due to the traffic; one gas station reported a 30% decline in revenue while traffic was detoured through town. Delays of thirty to fifty minutes on the  detour were typical, although trains passing through Gore could lengthen wait times by 15 minutes.

Spurs

SH-10A (6.3 mi) runs from SH-10 north of Gore to SH-100 near Lake Tenkiller.
SH-10C (4.4 mi) is a short branch of SH-10 in Ottawa County.  Its western terminus is at SH-10, and its eastern terminus is at the Missouri state line, north of Seneca, Missouri.  It continues as Missouri Supplemental Route U which runs less than a mile before it ends at Route 43 north of Seneca, Missouri.  The highway is relatively straight, though hilly, and no communities are located on the highway.

Junction list

References

External links

 SH-10 at OKHighways
 OK-10 on Two Wheel Oklahoma

010
Tahlequah, Oklahoma
Transportation in Osage County, Oklahoma
Transportation in Washington County, Oklahoma
Transportation in Nowata County, Oklahoma
Transportation in Craig County, Oklahoma
Transportation in Ottawa County, Oklahoma
Transportation in Delaware County, Oklahoma
Transportation in Adair County, Oklahoma
Transportation in Cherokee County, Oklahoma
Transportation in Muskogee County, Oklahoma
Transportation in Sequoyah County, Oklahoma